The so-called Swiss  Goldcoast (Ger. Goldküste) is the name given to the lower eastern shore of the Lake of Zürich. This prosperous region lies on the north-eastern shore of the lake and thus benefits from the evening sun. The Goldcoast is noted for its low tax rate and high property prices.  The sunny south-western slopes of the Pfannenstiel mountain are given over to wine growing. The opposite shore, however, is derisively dubbed ‘the Sniffle Coast’ (Swiss German dialect ‘Pfnüselküste’) because its topography and north-easterly aspect mean that it lies in the shadow of its own mountains  – a state of affairs which often occurs in the early winter evenings and in contrast to the Goldcoast, which remains bathed in sunshine. The following municipalities are situated on the Goldcoast: Küsnacht, Zollikon, Erlenbach, Herrliberg, Meilen, Uetikon am See, Männedorf and Stäfa. All of the above are within the district of Meilen (Meilen District). The rest of the right shore of the lake is sometimes also referred to as being on the Goldcoast.

Goldcoast railway line

The railway line along the right shore from Zürich to Rapperswil is known as the Goldcoast Express.  On 26 May 1968 service along this route started with unusual wine-red ‘Mirage’ multiple unit railcars which were capable of operating at high speed. This was a further development of the Zürich S-Bahn, which opened in 1990.

Notes

References
 
 

Regions of Switzerland
Geography of Switzerland